Fast Train is a 1988 Soviet television film directed by  and based on a screenplay by Elena Laskareva.

Plot 
Dining car waitress Olga Koreneva arrives in the village of Ferzikovo, home to her mother, Ksenia, and her son, Anton (nicknamed Spine). Ksenia's neighbors trust Olga. Ksenia inherited a small apartment from Baba Vali, who has recently died. Anton has constantly been at boarding school. Because of the son, fights constantly occur between Olga and Ksenia. To be with her beloved, Olga decides to take her son away from her mother.

Cast 
 Elena Mayorova as Olga Koreneva
 Zhenya Pivovarov as Anton (Spine), Olga's son
 Lyudmila Zaytseva as Vera Vasilyevna
 Lidia Savchenko as Ksenia, Olga's mother
 Galina Stakhanova as Alla
 Alexander Safronov as Rybakov
 Alexander Boukleev as Pavel, director of the dining car

Shooting
Part of the filming took place in the village of Ferzikovo. The film includes shots of Ferzikovo railway station and footage of the boarding school, where the son of the main character Olga studies. The filming took place in the existing boarding school, which was located on the estate of Alexander Nikolayevich Chirikov.

Award
The prize for Best Actress at the "Constellation" (Sozvezdie) film festival (Elena Mayorova)

References

External links

 Fast train on Mosfilm
 Скорый поезд (фильм)

Soviet television films
Rail transport films
Mosfilm films
1988 drama films